FC Nistru Cioburciu was a Moldovan football club based in Cioburciu, Moldova. Club was founded in 1992 and played 4 seasons in Moldovan National Division, before dissolution in 1996.

References

External links
FC Nistru Cioburciu  at weltfussballarchiv
 FC Nistru Cioburciu at DiviziaNationala.com 

Football clubs in Moldova
Defunct football clubs in Moldova
Association football clubs established in 1992
Association football clubs disestablished in 1996
1992 establishments in Moldova
1996 disestablishments in Moldova